Nikita Aleksandrovich Shurshin (born 8 April 1993) is a Russian professional racing cyclist. He rode at the 2015 UCI Track Cycling World Championships.

References

External links

1993 births
Living people
Russian male cyclists
Cyclists from Moscow
Cyclists at the 2016 Summer Olympics
Olympic cyclists of Russia